Bathynomus giganteus is a species of aquatic crustacean, of the order Isopoda. It is a member of the giant isopods (Bathynomus), and as such it is related - albeit distantly - to shrimps and crabs.  It was the first Bathynomus species ever documented, and was described in 1879 by French zoologist Alphonse Milne Edwards after the isopod was found in fishermen's nets off the coast of the Dry Tortugas in the Gulf of Mexico.

The Bathynomus is benthic and abundant in cold waters with a depth of 310-2140m in the West-Atlantic, including the Gulf of Mexico and Caribbean. It was the first species of Bathynomus to be described and historically it was reported from other oceans, but these are now recognized as other closely-related species. The unusually large size of Bathynomus has been attributed to an effect called deep-sea gigantism, where invertebrates living in cold deep waters tend to grow larger and have longer lifespans.

Physical description
Like most crustaceans, the body of Bathynomus giganteus is divided into three distinct regions; a head (cephalon), a thorax, and an abdomen (pleon). They have large triangular compound eyes that are spaced very far apart and have over 4000 individual facets. When light bounces off a highly-reflective layer called the tapetum lucidum at the back of their eyes, it makes them appear to glow. B. giganteus, reaches a typical length between 19 and 36cm an individual claimed to be 76cm long has been reported by the popular press, but the largest confirmed was ca. 50cm.

Reproduction 
Bathynomus reproduce via egg-laying. Mature females develop a pouch known as a marsupium, where the eggs are stored until the young are ready to emerge as miniatures of the adults, known as manca, completely bypassing a larval stage.  Mancas can reach length up to 60mm and are characterized by their lack of the seventh pair of pereiopods.  The reproductive anatomy of Bathynomus giganteus resembles that of other isopods. The female of B. giganteus while being so many times larger than females of other isopods, carries approximately the same number of eggs in its marsupium.  The eggs however, show an increase in size which appears to be almost proportional to the increase in body size.  The reproductive organs of the males also resemble those of the males of smaller isopod species.

Aquaculture 
Giant isopods are not usually fished commercially. However, other Bathynomus species can be found in the occasional oceanside restaurant in northern Taiwan, where they are boiled and typically served with rice.

References 

Cymothoida
Crustaceans of the Atlantic Ocean
Crustaceans described in 1879
Taxa named by Alphonse Milne-Edwards